Mobile Forces is a first-person shooter video game developed by Rage Software using the Unreal Engine and published by Majesco Entertainment. The core team of Rage Games who developed Mobile Forces went on to become Realtime Worlds.

Gameplay
Mobile Forces is a first person shooter game where battles against the opposing team or against other players happen to win matches. Game features two singleplayer modes - Missions and Skirmish. In the former, players are required to excel at a set number of game styles in order to unlock further maps on which to play. Within each next map, bot difficulty level rises up and goes through seven bot skill levels. Skirmish game mode allows to play custom matches.

Mobile Forces has eight different game modes:
Deathmatch - the goal of this game style is to eliminate players in the map.
Team Deathmatch - similar to Deathmatch, only played in teams - Red and Blue.
Captains - in this game mode each team gets a captain and it is needed to kill opposing team's leader in order to score a point.
Capture the flag - in this game type both teams have to steal each other's flags in order to win.
Holdout - this game mode has a resemblance to the King of the Hill style. Specifically, one team is tasked with defending a beacon on a map, which the aggressor team must take within a period of time to win.
Detonation - in this game style members of both sides scramble to acquire a keycard located centrally in the map, which must then be taken to a console in the opposing team's base to activate an explosive device to score.
Safe Cracker - this game type involves the infiltration of the enemy team's base where it is needed to open the safe and retrieve the loot. After the match attackers and defenders switch between each other.
Trailer - the use of vehicles is integral to success in this team game style, requiring players to drive explosive-laden units into the base of their opponents in order to get points.

Unlike the games Counter-Strike and Unreal Tournament, Mobile Forces features its own weapon system. On the spawn, the loadout screen is given with a selection of armament and armoury. The more lethal weapons are taken from loadout (e. g. rocket launcher or the heavy machinegun), the less it is left for the life preserving sundries of body armor and adrenaline shots. Full equip tends to have an effect to player's speed of movement (slow movement).

The game also introduces a combination of vehicle and FPS gameplay what was the rarity at the time the game was released.

Development
By the time the studio was set up, Rage team had to make a game, they were uncertain what it will be. The crew made many titles, so they were sure that they will come out with something. The desire was to make a FPS game, so Rage team signed a license for Unreal Engine and started working on Mobile Forces.

The reason Rage team chose to work on Unreal Engine was that many good games were created by that time using the software: "We chose to use Unreal Technology because it's a well proven system that many good games have been built on. There are several "proven" systems but none as consistent as Unreal. And we wanted some of that." said Daniel Leyden in the Gamefaction.com interview.

The main inspiration was the game Codename Eagle. As it featured a bunch of great implementations in that time, the game wasn't focused on anything else (e.g. single player and multiplayer gameplay, AI) and Rage wanted not to repeat the same mistake (keep the elements in the game balanced).

It took 18 months to create the game (started at the end of the year 2000).

References

External links
Official Majesco Entertainment Website

2002 video games
First-person shooters
Unreal Engine games
Video games developed in the United Kingdom
Windows games
Windows-only games
Rage Games games
Majesco Entertainment games
Multiplayer and single-player video games